Khadar (also Romanized as Khādar) is a village in Shandiz Rural District, Shandiz District, Torqabeh and Shandiz County, Razavi Khorasan Province, Iran. At the 2006 census, its population was 402, in 121 families.

References 

Populated places in Torqabeh and Shandiz County